Annie Isabella James (22 April 1884–6 February 1965) was a New Zealand Presbyterian medical missionary who served in China. She was born in Otepopo (now Herbert), North Otago, New Zealand on 22 April 1884.

References

1884 births
1965 deaths
New Zealand Presbyterian missionaries
People from Otago
Female Christian missionaries
Presbyterian missionaries in China
New Zealand expatriates in China
Christian medical missionaries